is a Japanese three-piece rock band formed in 2006. In September 2009, they signed with Sony Music Japan's Ki/oon Records and made their major-label debut.

Members
  - vocals, guitar
 Birthdate: April 20, 1986
  - drums
 Birthdate: November 20, 1986
  - bass
 Birthdate: May 27, 1986
 Nickname:

Biography
The band first formed when all three members were attending the same music college. Suzuki and Ito, classmates since high school, were introduced to bassist Konno through a mutual friend, and in 2006 they began playing around Tokyo under the name Sound Coordination. In 2009, they signed with Ki/oon Records and released their first major-label single, Slow Down. The band's second single, Light Infection, was featured as the opening theme during Season 4 of the anime series Gin Tama. The band's fourth single, Balance Doll, was used as the eighteenth ending theme of the anime series Gin Tama.

History
2006
Prague forms
2009
September 9 First single, Slow Down, released via Ki/oon Records
December 9 2nd single, Light Infection, released. Hits 25th on the Oricon charts.
December 29 Appear at the Countdown Japan 09/10 festival.
2010
Prague presents "Light Infection" Tour starts
May 12 3rd single, Distort, released
June 29 Special free concert Perspective at Shibuya Quattro
July 14 1st album Perspective released
July 27, August 31, September 28 Prague Monthly Sessions "Fire Fire Fire" concert series
August 7 Appear at the Rock in Japan Festival 2010
December 28 Appear at Countdown Japan 10/11 festival
2011
January 15 Volume 1 of Prague-Stream, the band's semi-regular Ustream concert series
May 26 Solo concert at Shimokitazawa Shelter

Discography

Singles
 Slow Down - (September 9, 2009)
 Light Infection - (December 9, 2009)
 Distort - (May 12, 2010)
 Balance Doll - (August 10, 2011)
 Dasso no Season - (November 21, 2012)

Albums
 Perspective (July 14, 2010)
 Hanataba (March 11, 2011)
 Akegata no Metaphor (October 26, 2011)

References

External links
 Official site
 Official Facebook Page
 English site

Japanese rock music groups
Ki/oon Music artists